Currents is an American metalcore band from Fairfield, Connecticut, formed in 2011. After numerous line-up changes, they consist of singer Brian Wille, guitarists Ryan Castaldi and Chris Wiseman, bassist and backing vocalist Christian Pulgarin, and drummer Matt Young.

History 
In January 2013, the debut EP Victimized was released independently with five tracks on it. Two years later, on January 23, 2015, they released the EP Life // Lost, in which Ricky Armellino from This or the Apocalypse appears as a guest musician, was also released independently.

At the beginning of March 2017, the band was signed by the US independent label SharpTone Records. On June 16 of the same year, the band's debut album, The Place I Feel Safest, was released via SharpTone Records. On May 4, 2018 the band released the instrumental version of the album. On December 14, 2018, Currents released their EP entitled I Let the Devil In through SharpTone Records; also included in the EP was the instrumental version of the EP.

On June 5, 2020, Currents released their second album, The Way it Ends through SharpTone Records. The album received positive reviews from critics. Kris Pugh of Distorted Sound Magazine applauded the band, saying: "At a time where there seems to be a new emerging modern metalcore band around every corner, CURRENTS have just gone a long way to making a lot of them feel somewhat irrelevant." On April 20, 2021, the band released the instrumental edition of the album.

On August 31, 2022, Currents released a new single "The Death We Seek". On November 25, 2022, the band released another new single "Vengeance". On February 1, 2023, Currents released the third single "Remember Me".

On February 2, Currents announced a new album with the name "The Death We Seek" to come out on the 5th of May 2023.

Music 
Currents has been categorized as metalcore and progressive metal, with influences of djent. According to Morten Wenzek of Metal Hammer Germany, the band "copied European djent well", referring to progenitors like Novelists, Emmure and Loathe. Currents incorporate heavy riffs, breakdowns, djent guitars, and melodic rhythms, and singer Brian Wille alternates between clear and screaming vocals.

Members 

Current members
 Brian Wille – vocals (2015–present)
 Chris Wiseman – guitars (2014–present)
 Ryan Castaldi – guitars (2014–present)
 Christian Pulgarin – bass, backing unclean vocals (2020–present)
 Matt Young – drums (2019–present)

Past members
 Patrizio Arpaia – vocals (2011–2015)
 Mitch Lobuglio – guitars (2011–2013)
 Tim Marzik – guitars (2013–2014)
 Karl Kohler – bass (2013–2014)
 Chris Segovia – bass (2011–2013)
 Dee Cronkite – bass (2014–2020)
 Jeff Brown – drums (2011–2018)

Timeline

Discography 
Albums
 The Place I Feel Safest (2017, SharpTone)
 The Way It Ends (2020, SharpTone)
 The Death We Seek (2023, SharpTone)

Extended Plays
 Victimized (2013, Self-released)
 Life // Lost (2015, Self-released)
 I Let the Devil In (2018, SharpTone)

References

External links 
 Official website

Heavy metal musical groups from Connecticut
Metalcore musical groups
Metalcore musical groups from Connecticut